The 1916 Indiana gubernatorial election was held on November 7, 1916. Republican nominee James P. Goodrich narrowly defeated Democratic nominee John A. M. Adair with 47.80% of the vote.

General election

Candidates
Major party candidates
James P. Goodrich, Republican, member of the Republican National Committee
John A. M. Adair, Democratic, U.S. Representative from Indiana's 8th congressional district

Other candidates
William W. Farmer, Socialist
Alfred L. Mondy, Prohibition
Thomas A. Dailey, Progressive
Joe B. Trunko, Socialist Labor

Results

References

1916
Indiana
Gubernatorial